Sayram-Ugam National Park (Sairam-Ögem ūlttyq  parkı), also Sairam-Ugam, is a mountainous region of the Western Tian Shan Mountains, on the border with Uzbekistan. Ugam-Chatkal National Park of Uzbekistan is across the border, and Aksu-Zhabagly Nature Reserve of Kazakhstan is directly to the northeast along the border. The area has high levels of species diversity, covering floral communities from steppe to high altitude zones. It is particularly known for stands of juniper forests, and stands of fruit and nut trees. Sayram-Ugam is located in Kazygurt District, Tole Bi District and Tulkibas District of South Kazakhstan Region.

Topography
Sayram-Ugam is situated on the northern slopes and spurs of the Western Tain Shen Mountains, including the Ugam Range, the Karatau Mountains, Boraldaytau and Talas Alatau.  The name draws on the nearby historic town of Sayram, and the Ugam Range.
The park is officially divided into four sectors: an environmentally protected zone (55%), a zone of limited economic activity, a zone for recreational and tourist activities (13%), and an area of environmental stabilization (9%).

Ecoregion
The park is in the Gissaro-Alai open woodlands ecoregion (WWF #0808), which covers the mountainous area at the meeting points of southern Kazakhstan, western Kyrgyzstan, Tajikistan, and Uzbekistan, in the Panir and Tian Shen mountain ranges.  The ecoregion is known for a climate favorable for fruit and nut trees, such as walnut, pistachio, pears, almonds, apples and cherries.

Climate
The climate in the Sayram-Ugam region is "Cold, Semi-Arid Climate" (Koeppen Classification BSk).  This climate is characteristic of steppe climates intermediary between desert and humid climates.  Typically, precipitation is just above evapotranspiration.
Average precipitation is 362 mm per year, with variations due to altitude and location.

Plants and animals
The park has seven natural altitude zones, ranging from mountain steppe to alpine and glaciated peaks.  Approximately one-third of the park is forested, including sparse forests of juniper.  The non-forest land includes rocky peaks and over 11 km2 of glaciers.  The area is known for having many wild varieties of well-known cultivated fruit and nut trees: apple, pear, walnut, plum, and grape.  Scientists have recorded 1,635 species of plants in the park, 35 of which are endemic.  Of the 59 known mammal species in the park, 22 are rodents, including the house mouse, the wood mouse, and the Turkestan rat.  Predators include fox, wolf and jackal.  Mountain goats, wild boar, and roe deer are present, but hunting in the past has reduced their presence on some ranges.

Tourism
Though much of the area is protected for nature conservation, there are 10 tourist routes in the park.  The routes support hiking, horseback, and on some lengths, buses.  Hiking trails range from 7 to 72 km.  Facilities include campsites, hiking trails, viewing platforms, baths and saunas, yurts to let (without services), a hotel, and access to guides and translators.

References

External links
 Video Review of Sayram-Ugam Park (in English)

National parks of Kazakhstan
Turkistan Region